Knut Borchardt (2 June 1929 – 5 February 2023) was a German researcher, historian and former professor for history and economics at both the Ludwig Maximilian University of Munich and the University of Mannheim from 1962 to 1969. Moreover, he served as rector at the University of Mannheim between 1967 and 1969.

Education
Borchardt was born in Berlin, Germany. He studied from 1949 to 1954 economics, business administration, history and german studies at the Ludwig Maximilian University of Munich where he obtained his Diplom (former German master's equivalent) in 1954. Afterwards, he obtained his doctorate in economics and his habilitation in 1961 at the Ludwig Maximilian University of Munich.

Academics
Borchardt worked from 1961 to 1962 as assistant professor at the University of Tübingen. After a proposal in 1962, he became professor for economics and history at the University of Mannheim. In 1967, Gaugler became rector (president) of the university and remained in this position until 1969. He was succeeded by Hans-Martin Pawlowski in his role as rector of the UMA. He left the university in 1969 and remained until his retirement in 1991 at the Ludwig Maximilian University of Munich. 
Borchardt was author of the well-known "Borchardt-Hypothesis", which claims that stabilisation policy in Germany during the Great Depression was credit constrained and that lack of budgetary discipline during the preceding years was instrumental in creating this constraint. In 1987 he received the Gottfried Wilhelm Leibniz Prize and in 1999 the Bavarian Maximilian Order for Science and Art. Between 1968 and 1982 Borchardt was editor of the influential Jahrbücher für Nationalökonomie und Statistik.

Death
Borchardt died on 5 February 2023, at the age of 93.

Publications
 Die Industrielle Revolution in Deutschland. London 1969. 
 Wachstum, Krisen, Handlungsspielräume der Wirtschaftspolitik. Göttingen 1982.  (engl. 1991)
 Grundriss der deutschen Wirtschaftsgeschichte. Göttingen 1985. 
 Wirtschaftspolitik in der Krise. Die (Geheim-)Konferenz der Friedrich List-Gesellschaft im September 1931 über Möglichkeiten und Folgen einer Kreditausweitung. (together with Hans Otto Schötz) Baden-Baden 1991. 
 Max Webers Börsenschriften. Rätsel um ein übersehenes Werk. Munich 2000. 
 Globalisierung in historischer Perspektive. Munich 2001.

See also
 List of University of Mannheim people
 University of Mannheim
 Munich
 Bavaria

References

External links
 List of Publications of Knut Borchardt

1929 births
2023 deaths
Academic staff of the University of Mannheim
Academic staff of the Ludwig Maximilian University of Munich
German economists
20th-century German historians
Ludwig Maximilian University of Munich alumni
German male non-fiction writers
Members of the Bavarian Academy of Sciences
Gottfried Wilhelm Leibniz Prize winners
Writers from Berlin
Officers Crosses of the Order of Merit of the Federal Republic of Germany